KKHG was a radio station on 92.3 FM in Hugo, Colorado. It was owned by Kona Coast Radio.

History
KHIH received its first callsign in 2008 and its license in 2011. It changed callsigns often and was one of several Kona Coast stations to bear the KKHI calls, now used on a sister station in Hawaii.

For most of its life, KKHG was silent under special temporary authority, first because of the move of co-owned KIIQ/KBUD, and then because Kona Coast sought to build common studios for the two stations (early operations for the station used a temporary studio at the transmitters). The licenses of KKHG and KBUD were surrendered in April 2016.

External links

Radio stations established in 2008
Radio stations disestablished in 2016
Defunct radio stations in the United States
Radio stations in Colorado
2008 establishments in Colorado
2016 disestablishments in Colorado
Defunct mass media in Colorado